Major Charles "Chuck" Delich is a retired American ice hockey player and coach. His association with The Air Force Academy also includes being a commissioned officer until his military retirement in 1993.

Career
Chuck Delich entered the Air Force Academy in the fall of 1973, joining the hockey club and immediately making an impact on the program. Delich led the Falcons in both Goals and Points in each of his four seasons, becoming not only the club's all-time leader in both (by a wide margin), but remains the NCAA's leading goal-scorer at the Division I level. Delich was twice named team MVP and served as co-captain in his senior season.

Delich began his active service after graduating but was able to return to Colorado Springs in 1981 to rejoin the hockey team as an assistant coach. Working under his former coach John Matchefts for four years, Delich was chosen as his successor and began serving as head coach in 1985. As had happened under Matchefts, Delich's tenure saw about as many winning seasons as not but he was able to shepherd the team through twelve seasons despite having few local opponents and not being part of an athletic conference. During the early part of his career Chuck was able to coach his younger brother Joe and in 1993, while still coach, Delich retired from military service as a Major. Delich stepped down as coach after the 1996–97 season, turning the reigns over to Frank Serratore.

Delich has been honored for his career several times including having the team MVP renamed in his honor a year after his retirement and being inducted into the Air Force Athletic hall of fame in 2011.

Career statistics

Head coaching record

References

External links

1955 births
Air Force Falcons men's ice hockey coaches
Air Force Falcons men's ice hockey players
American ice hockey coaches
American men's ice hockey forwards
Ice hockey coaches from Minnesota
Living people
People from Eveleth, Minnesota
United States Air Force Academy alumni
Ice hockey players from Minnesota
Military personnel from Minnesota